The Flanders Indoor Cyclo-cross is a cyclo-cross race held in the Nekkerhal in Mechelen, Belgium. It is the first ever indoor cyclo-cross race, which was held for the first time on 17 January 2007.

Past winners

References
 
 Report first edition

Cycle races in Belgium
Cyclo-cross races
Recurring sporting events established in 2007
2007 establishments in Belgium
Mechelen
Sport in Antwerp Province